The waterline is the line where the hull of a ship meets the surface of the water. Specifically, it is also the name of a special marking, also known as an international load line, Plimsoll line and water line (positioned amidships), that indicates the draft of the ship and the legal limit to which a ship may be loaded for specific water types and temperatures in order to safely maintain buoyancy, particularly with regard to the hazard of waves that may arise. Varying water temperatures will affect a ship's draft, because warm water is less dense than cold water, providing less buoyancy. In the same way, fresh water is less dense than salinated or seawater with a similar lessening effect upon buoyancy. 

For vessels with displacement hulls, the hull speed is defined by, among other things, the waterline length. In a sailing boat, the waterline length can change significantly as the boat heels, and can dynamically affect the speed of the boat.

A waterline can also refer to any line on a ship's hull that is parallel to the water's surface when the ship is afloat in a level trimmed position. Hence, waterlines are a class of "ships lines" used to denote the shape of a hull in naval architecture lines plans.

In aircraft design, the term "waterline" refers to the vertical location of items on the aircraft. This is (normally) the  axis of an  coordinate system, the other two axes being the fuselage station and buttock line.

Purpose

The purpose of a load line is to ensure that a ship has sufficient freeboard (the height from the water line to the main deck) and thus sufficient reserve buoyancy. The freeboard of commercial vessels is measured between the lowest point of the uppermost continuous deck at side and the waterline and this must not be less than the freeboard marked on the load line certificate issued to that ship. All commercial ships, other than in exceptional circumstances, have a load line symbol painted amidships on each side of the ship. This symbol is also permanently marked, so that if the paint wears off it remains visible. The load line makes it easy for anyone to determine if a ship has been overloaded. The exact location of the load line is calculated and verified by a classification society and that society issues the relevant certificates. This marking was invented in 1876 by Samuel Plimsoll.

History

In the Middle Ages, the Venetian Republic, the Republic of Genoa and the Hanseatic League required ships to show a load line. In the case of Venice this was a cross marked on the side of the ship, and of Genoa three horizontal lines.

The first 19th-century loading recommendations were introduced by Lloyd's Register in 1835, following discussions among shipowners, shippers and underwriters. Lloyd's recommended freeboards as a function of the depth of the hold (three inches per foot of depth). These recommendations, used extensively until 1880, became known as "Lloyd's Rule".

In the 1860s, after increased loss of ships due to overloading, a British MP, Samuel Plimsoll, took up the load line cause against strong opposition. A Royal Commission on unseaworthy ships was established in 1872, and in 1876 the United Kingdom Merchant Shipping Act made the load line mark compulsory, although the positioning of the mark was not fixed by law until 1894. In 1906, laws were passed requiring foreign ships visiting British ports to be marked with a load line. It was not until 1930 (the 1930 Load Line Convention) that there was international agreement for universal application of load line regulations.

In 1966 the International Convention on Load Lines was concluded in London which re-examined and amended the 1930 rules. The 1966 convention has since seen amendments in 1971, 1975, 1979, 1983, 1995 and 2003, none of which has entered into force.

Standard load line marks

The original "Plimsoll mark" was a circle with a horizontal line through it to show the maximum draft of a ship. Additional marks have been added over the years, allowing for different water densities and expected sea conditions.

Letters may also appear to the sides of the mark indicating the classification society that has surveyed the vessel's load line. These letters are approximately 115 millimetres in height and 75 millimetres in width. The load line length is referred to during and following load line calculations.

The letters on the load line marks have the following meanings:
  – tropical fresh water
  – fresh water
  – tropical seawater
  – summer temperate seawater
  – winter temperate seawater
  – winter North Atlantic

Freshwater marks make allowance for the fact that the ship will float deeper in freshwater than saltwater. A ship loaded to her fresh water mark in fresh water will float at her summer mark once she has passed into seawater at the same displacement. Similarly, if loaded to her tropical freshwater mark she will float at her tropical seawater mark once she passes into seawater.

The summer load line is the primary load line and it is from this mark that all other marks are derived. The position of the summer load line is calculated from the load line rules and depends on many factors such as length of ship, type of ship, type and number of superstructures, amount of sheer, and bow height. The horizontal line through the circle of the Plimsoll mark is at the same level as the summer load line.
The winter load line is one forty-eighth of the summer load draft below the summer load line.
The tropical load line is one forty-eighth of the summer load draft above the summer load line. 
The fresh water load line is an amount equal to  millimetres above the summer load line where Δ is the displacement in tonnes at the summer load draft and T is the tonnes per centimetre immersion at that draft. In any case where Δ cannot be ascertained, the freshwater load line is at the same level as the tropical load line. The position of the tropical fresh load line relative to the tropical load line is found in the same way as the freshwater load line is to the summer load line.
The winter North Atlantic load line is used by vessels not exceeding  in length when in certain areas of the North Atlantic Ocean during the winter period.

Timber load line marks
Certain vessels are assigned timber freeboards, but before these can be assigned, certain additional conditions have to be met. The letter L prefixes the load line marks to indicate a timber load line. Except for the timber winter North Atlantic freeboard, the other freeboards are less than the standard freeboards. This allows these ships to carry additional timber as deck cargo, but with the facility to jettison this cargo.

The letters on the timber load line marks have the following meanings:
  – timber tropical fresh water
  – timber fresh water
  – timber tropical seawater
  – timber summer seawater
  – timber winter seawater
  – timber winter North Atlantic

The summer timber load line is arrived at from the appropriate tables in the load line rules.

The winter timber load line is one thirty-sixth of the summer timber load draft below the summer timber load line.

The tropical timber load line is one forty-eighth of the summer timber load draft above the summer timber load line.

The timber fresh and the tropical timber fresh load lines are calculated in a similar way to the freshwater and tropical freshwater load lines, except that the displacement used in the formula is that of the vessel at her summer timber load draft. If this cannot be ascertained, then these marks will be one forty-eighth of the timber summer draft above the timber summer and timber tropical marks, respectively.

The timber winter North Atlantic load line is at the same level as the winter North Atlantic load line.

Subdivision load line marks
Passenger ships having spaces which are adapted for the accommodation of passengers and the carriage of cargo alternatively may have one or more additional load line marks corresponding to the subdivision drafts approved for the alternative conditions. These marks show P1 for the principal passenger condition, and P2, P3, etc., for the alternative conditions; however, in no case is any subdivision load line mark placed above the deepest load line in saltwater.

See also

 Ballast tank
 Coffin ship (insurance)
 Plimsoll shoe
 Sailing ballast
 SS London – sank in 1866 and stimulated Parliament to introduce the Plimsoll line
 Stability conditions (watercraft)
 The Onedin Line (episode "Danger Level")
 Waterline length

References

External links

 Historical background to the adoption of the Load Lines convention 
 More historical background
 Online water density calculator
IACS Unified Requirement L: Subdivision, Stability and Load Lines

Buoyancy
Ship measurements